is a passenger railway station located in the city of Kawagoe, Saitama, Japan, operated by the private railway operator Seibu Railway.

Lines
Minami-Ōtsuka Station is served by the Seibu Shinjuku Line between Seibu Shinjuku Station in Tokyo and Hon-Kawagoe Station in Kawagoe, and is located 43.9 km from the Seibu Shinjuku terminus.

Layout
The station consists of two side platforms serving two tracks.

Platforms

History
The station opened on 14 November 1897.

Station numbering was introduced on all Seibu Railway lines during fiscal 2012, with Minami-Ōtsuka Station becoming "SS28".

Passenger statistics
In fiscal 2019, the station was the 57th busiest on the Seibu network with an average of 16,937 passengers daily.

The passenger figures for previous years are as shown below.

Surrounding area
 Saitama Prefectural Kawagoe Minami High School
 Kan-Etsu Expressway

See also
 List of railway stations in Japan

References

External links

 Minami-Ōtsuka Station information (Seibu Railway) 

Railway stations in Saitama Prefecture
Railway stations in Japan opened in 1897
Railway stations in Kawagoe, Saitama
Seibu Ikebukuro Line
Stations of Seibu Railway